Brigadier General Herbert Towle Perrin (September 8, 1893 – June 9, 1962) was a United States Army officer, with the rank of brigadier general. He served during World War II and received the second highest military award, the Distinguished Service Cross, for his leadership as the acting commander of the 106th Infantry Division.

Biography

Perrin was born on September 8, 1893, in the city of Platteville, Wisconsin. He graduated from Kenyon College in 1916 and was a member of Delta Kappa Epsilon. Subsequently, he graduated from Princeton University in 1917. Perrin joined the Army in 1917 and had risen to the rank of captain by 1920.

After service at various infantry posts, he attended the United States Army Command and General Staff College at Fort Leavenworth, Kansas in 1933. Subsequently, Perrin served in the Adjutant General's Office from 1934 to 1938. In this capacity he was promoted to the rank of major on May 1, 1937.

In 1942 and 1943, Perrin served as chief of staff in the 76th Infantry Division under command of Major General William R. Schmidt.

In 1943, Perrin was promoted to brigadier general and was assigned to the 106th Infantry Division as the assistant division commander. Perrin participated with the division in the Rhineland Campaign, Ardennes-Alsace Campaign and Central Europe Campaign. During the Battle of the Bulge, his division commander, Major General Alan W. Jones suffered a heart attack and Perrin assumed command of the division.

Perrin stayed in command until February 1945 and was awarded the Distinguished Service Cross for his leadership of the division. He was succeeded by Major General Donald A. Stroh, and he returned to his position of assistant division commander and served in this command until 1946, when he was retired.

Perrin died at Mercy Hospital in Mount Vernon, Ohio at the age of 68 years after suffering a stroke at his home in Gambier, and was buried at Arlington National Cemetery alongside his wife, Anne Wilby Perrin (1884–1960).

Decorations

References

External links

Generals of World War II

1893 births
1962 deaths
People from Platteville, Wisconsin
People from Gambier, Ohio
Kenyon College alumni
Princeton University alumni
Burials at Arlington National Cemetery
United States Army personnel of World War I
United States Army generals
Recipients of the Distinguished Service Cross (United States)
Recipients of the Legion of Merit
United States Army generals of World War II
United States Army Command and General Staff College alumni
Military personnel from Wisconsin